Albano Lacus is one of a number of hydrocarbon lakes found on Saturn's largest moon, Titan.

The lake is composed of liquid methane and ethane, and was detected by the Cassini space probe.

The lake is named after Lake Albano in Italy, and the word "lacus" means lake. 

See also 
 Lakes of Titan
 Abaya Lacus
 Bolsena Lacus

References 

Lakes of Titan (moon)